WYFM (102.9 FM) is a commercial radio station licensed to Sharon, Pennsylvania, United States, serving the Youngstown, Ohio market with a classic rock format. It is one of eight radio stations in the Youngstown market owned by Cumulus Broadcasting with studios and transmitter at "The Radio Center" in Youngstown.  The station has a large coverage area and can be picked up fairly well even in Akron, and as far away as Erie, Pennsylvania. Within the large coverage area, WYFM competes with WNCD in Niles, WONE in Akron, WRQK in Canton, WFXJ in Ashtabula, WNCX in Cleveland, WRKT and WQHZ in Erie, and WDVE in Pittsburgh.

WYFM originally signed on the air as WPIC-FM in 1947, simulcasting sister AM 790 WPIC until the early 1970s.  The call letters were changed to WYFM in 1973.

From the early  1970s until November 1973, the station was known as "The Alternative at 102.9", following a music format that at the time was called "progressive" or "underground"; in effect, playing music that was not widely known and/or not readily available on the more popular AM radio stations.  Typical playlists would include artists such as Jimi Hendrix, Janis Joplin, Cream and lesser-known rock and roll performers.  Programmed by Ralph Caldwell with the consultancy of Edward John "Bo" Volz, it was the first station in the area to feature album-length selections and introduce new artists not heard on other stations.  The announcers, including Holly, Dan, Vince, Jimmy, Ralph and others, followed the practice of the day by using only their first name in identifying themselves.

Following the regular broadcast of a local high school basketball game on November 30, 1973, the reformatted and newly named "Y-103" (with program director Dan Messersmith and consultant Ron White) took to the air, using a format known as "Top 40", and eschewing the traditional banter of disk jockeys in favor of continuous music (with the requisite commercial announcements). While "Y-103" sounded like what later was considered an "automated" station (i.e., computer driven), it was actually operated by "announcers" who spoke rarely if ever,  following a strict format of preselected songs from a master playlist.

Y-103 broadcast from Pine Hollow Boulevard studios in Sharon  PA until November 1998, when the studios were moved to the "Radio Center" in Youngstown, OH.  The transmitter and antenna remained at the Pennsylvania location transmitting from, what was at the time of its construction the tallest self-support tower east of the Mississippi (500'), until 2001.  The Sharon tower has since been demolished.

WYFM is also the affiliate of the Cleveland Browns.

References

External links
Y-103 WYFM official website

Youngstown, Ohio
YFM
Classic rock radio stations in the United States
Radio stations established in 1947
1947 establishments in Pennsylvania
Cumulus Media radio stations
YFM